Ernest Forgas Pallarès (born 20 July 1993) is a Spanish professional footballer who plays for UE Olot as a forward.

Club career
Born in Barcelona, Catalonia, Forgas finished his formation with Gimnàstic de Tarragona's youth setup, and made his senior debuts with the farm team in the 2011–12 campaign, in Tercera División. On 1 August 2013 he moved to UE Rubí, in the same division.

On 16 June 2014, Forgas joined CE Sabadell FC, being assigned to the reserves also in the fourth level. On 25 October 2014, he played his first match as a professional, replacing Juanto Ortuño in the 63rd minute of a 0–1 away loss against RCD Mallorca in the Segunda División championship.

Forgas scored his first professional goal four days later, but in a 1–6 home loss against Sevilla FC for the season's Copa del Rey.

References

External links

1993 births
Living people
Footballers from Barcelona
Spanish footballers
Association football forwards
Segunda División players
Segunda División B players
Tercera División players
CF Pobla de Mafumet footballers
CE Sabadell FC footballers
CE Sabadell FC B players
CF Peralada players
CF Reus Deportiu B players
FC Andorra players
UE Olot players
Spanish expatriate footballers
Expatriate footballers in Andorra
Spanish expatriate sportspeople in Andorra